Murdered by My Boyfriend is a fact-based drama first aired on BBC Three in 2014. It stars Georgina Campbell as Ashley Jones, a young victim of domestic abuse at the hands of her controlling boyfriend, Reece, portrayed by Royce Pierreson.

It was based on an actual case of murder, with the victim's family asking the producers to give the characters different names. According to the producers, the purpose of the film is to educate juvenile viewers about relationship abuse.

Plot
Ashley meets Reece at a house party and accidentally becomes pregnant with his child. Reece's abusive personality shows more and more. Ashley's friends ask her to leave him, but she struggles to do so. Ultimately Ashley chooses to exit the relationship, then travels to Leicester where she sleeps with another man. In response, Reece kills her with an ironing board while their daughter watches from her bedroom. He is initially sentenced to fifteen years in prison, but his sentence is increased to twenty years on appeal due to the nature of the assault that resulted in her death.

Characters
 Ashley Jones - Jess Commons of Grazia states that Ashley is not a "pitiful victim" through and through but becomes inundated with abuse as the film progresses. Due to an increase in domestic violence involving people aged 16–24, the producers made Ashley a teenager. The mother of the real-life murder victim stated that "My daughter was strong-willed and independent, but her murderer manipulated, controlled, and persuaded her into continuing the relationship."
 Reece - Sophie Goddard of Cosmopolitan UK remarked that the character has a "likeable, personable side" and an "abusive, controlling, violent" one, which shows the "complexity of this situation for victims." Campbell states that initially Reece is "charming and older and funny and sweet".

Reception
In a piece for British broadsheet The Daily Telegraph, writer Regina Moriarty said: "I hope that people watching will note the way that Reece starts, little by little, to take control of Ashley's life, and if they can see that that's happening to them or someone they know, they'll do something about it – talk about it, get some more information... something".

Sarah Hughes of The Guardian wrote that the "veracity" of the story and the young ages of the characters "marks [it] apart" from similar works.

The programme won a Royal Television Society Award for best Single Drama in 2014, and Campbell won a BAFTA Award for Best Actress in 2015, ahead of bookmakers' favourite Sheridan Smith.

This drama was released on DVD on 21 September 2015.

References

External links
 
 Murdered by My Boyfriend - BBC Academy
 
 "Murdered by My Boyfriend, BBC One, review: 'convincing'"

2014 in British television
2014 plays
2014 television films
2014 films
BBC television dramas
Domestic violence in television
Murder in television